Man and Weapon (Persian: Ensan va aslahe) is a 1989 film by the Iranian director Mojtaba Raie. Raie also co-wrote the script for the film, which starred Farajollah Salahshoor, Khosrow Ziaee and Alireza Eshaghi. Set during the Iran-Iraq war, the film is an example of Sacred Defence cinema.

References

Iranian war drama films
1989 films